Bob Holder (born 1931) is a champion rodeo rider of Cootamundra, New South Wales, in 2019 reckoned as the world's oldest professional in the sport.

History
At the age of five Holder accompanied his father droving, and after some formal education became a successful real-estate agent with Elders Real Estate, Cootamundra, and lives in the district.

Holder first entered a competition as a Novice at Tumut rodeo aged 14, winning the bronc ride. In 1953 he won the Novice class at the Wagga showgrounds in October 1953. In March 1954 he came fourth in both the NSW bareback riding and bullock riding championshlps at Condobolin. Holder won the Riverina bareback riding championship at Narrandera a month later.

In 1959 he was invited to appear on the American rodeo circuit, on a tour that culminated at Madison Square Garden, one of the first Australian cowboys to be so honoured.

In later years his specialty was team roping as the "header", whose job is to lasso the horns of a steer while his partner (Brian Lawless, another Cootamundra resident) as "heeler" tackles the hind legs.

Recognition
On 23 October 2017 Holder was inducted into the Australian Professional Rodeo Association's Hall of Fame.

Holder's daughter Kerrie is a champion horse rider, specializing in barrel racing events.

References 

Rodeo in Australia
1931 births
Living people
Roping (rodeo)
Bareback bronc riders
Steer wrestlers